Julian Lage (born December 25, 1987) is an American guitarist and composer.

Career
A child prodigy, Lage was the subject of the 1996 short documentary film Jules at Eight. At 12, he performed at the 2000 Grammy Awards. Three years later, he became a faculty member of the Stanford Jazz Workshop at Stanford University. Classically trained at the San Francisco Conservatory of Music, he has studied at Sonoma State University and the Ali Akbar College of Music. He graduated from the Berklee College of Music in 2008.

On March 24, 2009 EmArcy released his debut album Sounding Point to favorable reviews. It was nominated for the 2010 Grammy Award Best Contemporary Jazz Album. His second album, Gladwell, was released April 26, 2011, to positive reviews. His first solo acoustic album, World's Fair, was released on March 2, 2015, and his fourth album, Arclight, was released on March 11, 2016.

He has worked in a trio with Scott Colley and drummer Kenny Wollesen and has recorded duo albums with guitarists Chris Eldridge, Gyan Riley, and Nels Cline. For the 2017 guitar duo album Mount Royal, Lage and Eldridge received a Grammy nomination for Best Contemporary Instrumental Album.

He is currently a faculty member at the New England Conservatory of Music.

Squint and View With a Room (2021-present)
On March 17, 2021, it was announced that he signed to Blue Note Records.  Along with the announcement, it was announced that his debut release on the label entitled Squint would be released on June 11.  The lead single "Saint Rose" was released on that day as well.  April 9 saw the release on the second single "Boo's Blues."  April 30 saw the release of the third single "Etude."  The fourth single "Familiar Flower" was released on May 21.

Lage's sophomore record on Blue Note entitled View With a Room was released on September 16, 2022  The lead single "Auditorium" was released on June 21.  "Word for Word," the second single, was released on July 13.  The third single "Tributary" was released on August 10.  The fourth single, "Chavez" was released on August 31st.

Discography

As leader 
 Sounding Point (EmArcy, 2009)
 Gladwell (EmArcy, 2011)
 Close to Picture EP with Chris Eldridge (Modern Lore, 2013)
 Free Flying with Fred Hersch (Palmetto, 2013)
 Avalon with Chris Eldridge (Modern Lore, 2014)
 Room with Nels Cline (Mack Avenue, 2014)
 World's Fair (Modern Lore, 2015)
 Arclight (Mack Avenue, 2016)
 Live in Los Angeles EP (Mack Avenue, 2017) 
 Mount Royal with Chris Eldridge (Free Dirt, 2017) 
 Modern Lore (Mack Avenue, 2018)
 Love Hurts (Mack Avenue, 2019)
 Squint (Blue Note, 2021)
 View with a Room (Blue Note, 2022)
 Layers (Blue Note, 2023)

As sideman 
With Gary Burton
 Generations (Concord Jazz, 2004)
 Next Generation (Concord Jazz, 2005)
 Common Ground (Mack Avenue, 2011)
 Guided Tour (Mack Avenue, 2013)

With John Zorn
 Midsummer Moons (Tzadik, 2017)
 Insurrection (Tzadik, 2018)
 Salem 1692 (Tzadik, 2018)
 The Book Beri'ah (Tzadik, 2018)
 Nove Cantici Per Francesco D'Assisi (Tzadik, 2019)
 Virtue (Tzadik, 2020)
 Songs for Petra (Tzadik, 2020)
 Teresa De Ávila (Tzadik, 2021)
 Parables (Tzadik, 2021)
 New Masada Quartet (Tzadik, 2021)
 A Garden Of Forking Paths (Tzadik, 2021)
 Incerto (Tzadik, 2022)

With others
 Terri Lyne Carrington, More to Say (E1, 2009)
 Nels Cline, Lovers (Blue Note, 2016)
 Nels Cline, Currents, Constellations (Blue Note, 2018)
 Kris Davis, Duopoly (Pyroclastic, 2016)
 Virgil Donati, Ruination (Gildon Music, 2019)
 Dave Douglas, Uplift Twelve Pieces for Positive Action (Greenleaf Music, 2018)
 Taylor Eigsti, Lucky to Be Me (Concord Jazz, 2006)
 David Grisman, Dawg Duos (Acoustic Disc, 1999)
 Eric Harland, Voyager: Live by Night (Space Time, 2011)
 Eric Harland, Vipassana (GSI, 2014)
 Jesse Harris, No Wrong No Right (Dangerbird, 2015)
 Charles Lloyd, 8: Kindred Spirits (Live from the Lobero) (Blue Note, 2020)
 Sophie Milman, in the Moonlight (E1, 2011)
 Yoko Ono, Take Me to the Land of Hell (Chimera Music, 2013)
 Dayna Stephens, Today Is Tomorrow (Criss Cross, 2012)
 Dayna Stephens, Peace (Sunnyside, 2014)

Awards and nominations

References

External links 
 Official website
 On Marian McPartland's Piano Jazz

20th-century American guitarists
21st-century American guitarists
American jazz guitarists
Living people
1987 births
Palmetto Records artists
People from Santa Rosa, California
Mack Avenue Records artists
EmArcy Records artists
Jazz musicians from California